This is a list of Telugu-language films produced in Tollywood in India that are released/scheduled to be released in the year 2023.

Box office collection 
The highest-grossing Tollywood films released in 2023, by worldwide box office gross revenue, are as follows:

January – March

April–June

July – September

Notes

References

External links 

2023

2023 in Indian cinema
Telugu_films_of_2023